Lepidocyrtus lignorum is a species of slender springtail in the family Entomobryidae. It is found in Europe.

References

External links

 

Collembola
Articles created by Qbugbot
Animals described in 1775
Taxa named by Johan Christian Fabricius